Robert Couper (19 December 1927 – 24 March 1997) was a New Zealand cricketer. He played three first-class matches for Otago in 1951/52.

Couper was born at Palmerston North in 1927 and educated at Christ's College, Christchurch. He ran a farm. He died at Taihape in 1997 and an obituary was published in the New Zealand Cricket Annual in 2003.

References

External links
 

1927 births
1997 deaths
New Zealand cricketers
Otago cricketers
Cricketers from Palmerston North